Camera Obscura is a Scottish indie pop band from Glasgow. The group formed in 1996, and have released five albums to date – the most recent of which, Desire Lines, was released in 2013. The current members of the band are vocalist Tracyanne Campbell, guitarist Kenny McKeeve, bassist Gavin Dunbar, and drummer Lee Thomson. The band undertook an extended hiatus in 2015, following the death of long-serving keyboardist Carey Lander. The surviving members later reconvened in 2018. 

The band's bright take on indie pop has been frequently described as "twee pop," and garnered comparisons to fellow Scottish band Belle & Sebastian. The band have also been praised for their "honest, wide, and adult approach to heartbreak, romantic liaisons, and escapism."

History
Camera Obscura were formed in 1996 by Tracyanne Campbell, John Henderson and Gavin Dunbar. Several other members performed with the band before David Skirving joined as a permanent guitarist. Their first releases were the singles "Park and Ride" and "Your Sound" in 1998. The band's line-up changed in 2000 and 2001 when Lee Thomson joined as its permanent drummer, Lindsay Boyd joined as a keyboard player, and Skirving left and was replaced by Kenny McKeeve.

Camera Obscura's first album, Biggest Bluest Hi Fi, was released in 2001. The album was produced by Stuart Murdoch of Belle & Sebastian and was supported by John Peel. The first single from the album, "Eighties Fan", came in at number eight in the Festive Fifty in 2001, and charted in several independent music charts. Nigel Baillie joined the band as a trumpeter and percussionist in 2002 and Carey Lander replaced Boyd. In the summer of 2002, Peel asked the band to do their first Peel session.

The band's second album, Underachievers Please Try Harder, was released in 2003 and was followed by Camera Obscura's first full tour of Great Britain and Ireland and the band's first tour of the United States. Founding member John Henderson left Camera Obscura following this tour. In early 2004 the band recorded the songs "I Love My Jean" and "Red, Red Rose" following their third Peel session, in which Peel had asked them to put these poems by Robert Burns to music.

Camera Obscura recorded their third album, Let's Get Out of This Country, in Sweden over the course of two weeks with producer Jari Haapalainen. The album was released on 6 June 2006. The first single, "Lloyd, I'm Ready to Be Heartbroken", is an answer song to Lloyd Cole and the Commotions' song "Are You Ready to Be Heartbroken?"; it appears during the opening credits of the 2007 film, P.S. I Love You. The title song was featured in episode 5 of Friday Night Lights.

In November 2008, the band announced that they had completed recording the follow-up to Let's Get Out of This Country, and in February 2009, they announced they had signed with 4AD. The new album, My Maudlin Career, was released in April 2009, and preceded by the first single "French Navy". London-based jewellery brand Tatty Devine created brooches and necklaces to coincide with the launch. The album was the band's first UK Top 40 success, and it also reached the top 40 in Ireland and the US Billboard Top 100. Around this time, the band announced that "due to family commitments (including being a proud dad) Nigel will no longer be a full time member of Camera Obscura".

On 18 April 2009, Camera Obscura released a special edition Record Store Day 7" called "French Navy" for independent record stores. "French Navy" was also used by Echo Falls, who are the sponsors of Come Dine with Me, at the start of each episode and during commercial breaks. Their album Desire Lines was produced by Tucker Martine and released by 4AD on 3 June 2013. The album was the band's second UK Top 40 entry and narrowly missed the US Top 100.

In 2015, the band announced the cancellation of planned gigs in North America due to the illness of Carey Lander. She was first diagnosed with osteosarcoma in 2011. She announced in 2015 that it had returned. Lander set up a JustGiving page for Sarcoma UK in order to raise awareness to the illness and lack of funding for research and treatment, and as of November 2015, the sum of donations is over £73,000. Carey Lander died on 11 October 2015.

In May 2018, while Campbell was promoting the self-titled debut album of Tracyanne & Danny, her new project with Danny Coughlan, she noted that she still kept in touch with the other members of Camera Obscura in the wake of Lander's passing, but the future of the band remained undiscussed. The song "Alabama" from the Tracyanne & Danny album is Campbell's tribute to Lander.

On 5 September 2018, Camera Obscura announced their live return as part of the Boaty Weekender, a cruise festival curated by Belle & Sebastian sailing from Barcelona to Cagliari on 8–12 August 2019.

Prior to participating in the Boaty Weekender, the band announced a warm-up show at Saint Luke's & The Winged Ox in Glasgow on 5 August with proceeds donated to the Prince and Princess of Wales Hospice in memory of Carey Lander. After tickets for the show were sold out, the band added a second date with proceeds also being donated.

For these shows and the Boaty Weekender, the band brought in Donna Maciocia, formerly of Amplifico, on keyboards and backing vocals.

On 5 August 2019, Camera Obscura hinted at the possibility of releasing new music when responding to a tweet referring to Desire Lines as their "5th and final album," to which the band replied "It's definitely our fifth album.....". The band confirmed in May 2020 that they were preparing a new album, but had been forced to delay recording it due to the COVID-19 pandemic.

Members

Current members
Tracyanne Campbell – vocals, guitar (1996–2015, 2018–present)
Gavin Dunbar – bass (1996–2015, 2018–present)
Lee Thomson – drums (2000–2015, 2018–present)
Kenny McKeeve – guitar, vocals (2001–2015, 2018–present)

Current touring musicians
Tim Cronin – trumpet, percussion (2009–2015)
Donna Maciocia – keyboards, vocals (2019)

Former members
John Henderson – vocals, percussion (1996–2004)
Richard Colburn – drums (1998)
David Skirving – vocals, guitar (1998–2001)
Lindsay Boyd – keyboards (2000–2002)
Nigel Baillie – trumpet, percussion (2002–2009)
Carey Lander – piano, organ, vocals (2002–2015; died 2015)

Former touring musicians
Frànçois Marry – trumpet, percussion, guitar (2003–2009)

Discography

Albums

Singles

Compilations and EPs
Rare UK Bird (December 1999, Quattro) Japan-only
4AD Sessions EP (19 April 2014, 4AD) Record Store Day

Other contributions
Acoustic 07 (2007, V2 Records) – "Let's Get Out of This Country"
The Saturday Sessions: The Dermot O'Leary Show (2007, EMI) – "Super Trouper"

See also 

 List of bands from Glasgow
 List of Scottish musicians

References

External links

Official site

Musical groups established in 1996
Musical groups from Glasgow
British indie pop groups
Scottish indie rock groups
4AD artists
1996 establishments in Scotland
Elefant Records artists
Merge Records artists